Volkov Commander (VC) is a file manager for DOS inspired by the Norton Commander. Volkov Commander is purely written in assembly language, and is thus very small (less than 100 KB) and fast.

Volkov Commander was written by Vsevolod V. Volkov, a programmer from Ukraine, born in 1971. The stable version of the program is released as shareware. A preview version is also available, which is interchangeably mentioned as an Alpha or Beta release on the website. The Webmaster for the public face of VC was Daniel R. Egner of Germany.

Version 4
Version 4.05 is the last fully functional release of the Volkov Commander. It is a pure DOS application, so it doesn't support special features of Windows 9x like long filenames. (Apart from that, it can be used under Windows 9x.) Besides the Russian version, there is an English one. Version 4 is shareware and can be tested free for 30 days.

Version 4.99
Vsevolod Volkov was working on a new version 5 of his commander (VC 5). It was still in a phase of development. This upgrade works in a Windows 9x / Windows NT or OS/2 environment. VC 5 supports long filenames, and can explore archives (*.zip, *.arc, *.rar, etc.) as though they were directories. When updated last time, the actual beta release was version 4.99.08 alpha. Most of the features of the final release are already available. Though it is a pure DOS application, the new commander supports some of the special features of Windows 95/98/NT. "Beta version (4.99.xx), of course, can be tested for free, because in this stadium of development it does not yet represent a complete program."

Rumored later version
Rumours about existing Version 5 of Volkov Commander:
In the community, someone posted about the existing VC 5. Here is what Vsevolod answered:
[...] VC 5.0 is a fake. The last released version is 4.99.08 alpha. [...] I really didn't release new version for very long time. So, development of VC is hold in fact. But I don't exclude possibility of new releases. I have no roadmap and could not promise something."

VC 4.99.08 is included within Ultimate Boot CD (UBCD) v3.4, as part of the general FreeDOS base package.

Volkov Commander is included in the NwDsk DOS network boot disk

See also
 Comparison of file managers
 Orthodox file manager

References

External links
 VC line of OFM - a masterpiece of assembler programming – from Softpanorama ebook "The Orthodox File Manager (OFM) Paradigm"
Picture of Vsevolod V. Volkov and Daniel R. Egner (webmaster) 
web.archive.org/web/20201027035410/http://www.softpanorama.org/OFM/Paradigm/Ch03/volkov_commander.shtml
web.archive.org/web/20020824173412/http://www.egner-online.de/vc/en/intro.shtml
Vsevolod V. Volkov's original repository in web.archive.org/web/20170514041132/http://vvv.kiev.ua/download/

DOS software
Orthodox file managers
Assembly language software
Ukrainian inventions